Eckert is a former unincorporated community, now a neighborhood within the boundaries of the incorporated town of Orchard City in Delta County, Colorado, United States. There is a U.S. Post Office in Eckert, the ZIP Code for which is 81418.

A post office called Eckert has been in operation since 1891. The community was named after Isadora "Dora" Eckert States, the wife of Charles Adelbert States, the first postmaster. 

Eckert Presbyterian Church is located in the area.

Geography
Eckert is located at  (38.842649,-107.961273).

References

Unincorporated communities in Delta County, Colorado
Unincorporated communities in Colorado